Bravelets is an e-commerce jewelry store that contributes a portion of the money from each purchase towards the charitable organization of the purchaser's choosing. The company, which is headquartered in Austin, Texas, was founded by Stephanie Hansen in early 2012 after her mother became ill with breast cancer.

About

Bravelets is a web-based retailer that sells pieces of jewelry, mainly bracelets, that are engraved with the words "be brave".  The organization was founded and is headquartered in Austin, Texas, and according to Bravelets' blog, the products are manufactured in Guangzhou, China. A cause marketing-based business, the company donates 10% from each purchase to the charity of the purchaser's choice. It also provides people with the ability to create their own customized pages, through which they can sell Bravelets products to raise money for a non-profit organization or to offset a family member's medical expenses.

The organization was founded by Stephanie Hansen in January 2012. Hansen came up with the idea the year before, while searching for jewelry for the family to wear together after Hansen's mother was diagnosed with breast cancer. Part of Hansen's motivation in creating her own cause marketing-based company was a frustration that other, existing options were unclear about how much of the proceeds of their sales went to the charitable organizations.

When the website was originally launched, there was only one model of bracelet for sale, which was offered in ten colors, each tied to a different cause. They have since expanded to include several types of bracelets, as well as earrings and necklaces. As of January 2016, the company's website claims to have donated just over of  2 million to charitable causes.

References

External links 
 Official website

Online jewelry retailers of the United States
Organizations based in Austin, Texas
American companies established in 2012
2012 establishments in Texas